Shek Lei Pui Reservoir is a reservoir in Kam Shan Country Park, Sha Tin, New Territories, Hong Kong. It is part of the Kowloon Group of Reservoirs. The total water storage capacity is 116 million gallons.

Formerly the site of Shek Lei Pui Village, the construction works of the reservoir began in 1923 and completed in 1925. Most of the villages were resettled in Hin Tin, a new village in Tai Wai, and the others to Kwai Chung.

Its two dams and the valve house built at the centre of the dam are listed as Grade II historic buildings.

See also
List of reservoirs of Hong Kong
Kowloon Group of Reservoirs
Kowloon Reservoir
Kowloon Reception Reservoir

References

Buildings and structures completed in 1925
Kowloon Group of Reservoirs